Alfred Robert Freebairn (1794–1846), was an English engraver.

Life
Freebairn was apparently the son of Robert Freebairn, the landscape painter, and is probably identical with the younger Freebairn who etched the Sketch-book of Robert Freebairn, published in 1815. He was a student at the Royal Academy, and engraved some vignettes and illustrations after Roberts, Prout, Pyne, and others for the Book of Gems and other popular works. His later work seems to have been entirely confined to the production of engravings by the mechanical process, invented by John Bate, known as the "Anaglyptograph". This machine was specially adapted for reproducing objects with raised surfaces, such as coins, medals, reliefs, &c. Freebairn's engraving The beautiful gate of the temple (published by Hodgson & Co.) was described, when it was released, in the following way:

Freebairn produced a large number of engravings by this process, some of which were published in the Art Union (1846). His most important works in this style of engraving were A salver of the 16th century’ after Jean Goujon, and a series of engravings of Flaxman's Shield of Achilles; the latter, a very remarkable work, was executed and published at Freebairn's own risk and expense, and only completed shortly before his death.

Death
He died suddenly on 21 August 1846, at the age of fifty-two, four days after the death of his mother to whom he was devoted. He is buried with her in Highgate Cemetery.

References

1794 births
1846 deaths
Burials at Highgate Cemetery
19th-century engravers
English engravers